Henry Flitcroft (30 August 1697 – 25 February 1769) was a major English architect in the second generation of Palladianism. He came from a simple background: his father was a labourer in the gardens at Hampton Court and he began as a joiner by trade. Working as a carpenter at Burlington House, he fell from a scaffold and broke his leg. While he was recuperating, the young Lord Burlington noticed his talent with the pencil, and by 1720 Flitcroft was Burlington's draughtsman and general architectural assistant, surveying at Westminster School for Burlington's dormitory, and superintending at the site at Tottenham House. Working life in the inner circle that was driving the new Palladian architecture was an education for Flitcroft.

Flitcroft redrew for publication the drawings for The Designs of Mr. Inigo Jones, published by William Kent in 1727, under Burlington's patronage and supervision. In May 1726 Burlington got his protégé an appointment at the Office of Works, where he worked his way up from Master Carpenter and Master Mason to Comptroller of the King's Works, a prestigious position at the top of the architectural field. Royal commissions came his way in the form of some private projects for junior members of the British Royal Family; namely the Duke of Cumberland. His work for the Duke  at Windsor Great Park included creating the Virginia Water Lake.

Flitcroft's hands were constantly occupied with private commissions and, like most professional architects (and unlike virtuoso earls), he did some speculative construction in new-building London streets, supplied stone, and contracted to erect the buildings he was designing.

Panelling and a mantelpiece from an old panelled room designed by Flitcroft in the 1720s from Potternewton Hall near Leeds were installed in Sutton Park in Yorkshire after 1935.

From 1746 to 1756, he was Surveyor of the Fabric of St Paul's Cathedral.

In 1724 Flitcroft married Sarah Minns at St Benet's, Paul's Wharf. His son Henry was born in Hampton (1742). Flitcroft is buried at St Mary with St Alban, Teddington, together with his son Henry (died 1826), and wife Jane (died 1778). The inscription on his tomb records that "Here lies the body of HENRY FLITCROFT of Whitehall in the county of Middlesex who had the honour of serving three first Princes of the House of Brunswick in the Board of Works of which he was successively Appointed Clerk, Master Mason & Controller in the last of which Office he continued till his death which happened on the 25th of February 1769." Inside the church on the west wall is a memorial to Henry Flitcroft.

Flitcroft Street, near St Giles in the Fields, London, was named after Henry Flitcroft.

Major commissions
Lilford Hall, Northamptonshire: 1740s. At Lilford he designed the interiors.
Bower House, Essex, 1729
St Giles in the Fields, London: 1731–1734.
Ditchley Park, Oxfordshire: 1724 onwards. At Ditchley he designed interiors, working in harmonious partnership with William Kent.
Wentworth Woodhouse, W. Riding, Yorkshire: 1735 onwards. He rebuilt and enlarged the west front and added wings.
St Giles House, Wimborne St Giles, Dorset: 1740–1744. Interiors.
Stowe House, Buckinghamshire: ca. 1742. The State gallery (attributed).
Wimpole Hall, Cambridgeshire: 1742–1745.
Stourhead, Wiltshire: 1744–1765. Garden temples
Woburn Abbey, Bedfordshire: 1748–1761.
Milton Hall, Northamptonshire: 1750–1751.

Flitcroft built extensively in the West End of London.

References

 H.M. Colvin, A Biographical Dictionary of British Architects, 1600–1840 (1997) 
 Heward, John and Taylor, Robert "The Country Houses of Northamptonshire". 

1697 births
1769 deaths
18th-century English architects
Chatham House people
Draughtsmen